The Wailpi are an indigenous people of South Australia They are also known as the Adnyamathanha, which also refers to a larger group, though they speak a dialect of the Adnyamathanha language.

Country
Their eastern extension ran above Wooltana. An early report by a police trooper in the area, Henry Quincy Smith, placed these 'hill people' at Mount Freeiing, Umberatana, Angipena, Ameandana. Lollabollana, Illawortina, the Daly and Stanley Mine (Poondinna).

Social organization and customs
The Wailpi practiced both circumcision and subincision.

Mythology
According to Henry Quincy Smith:-
They believe that two old women called Yammutu live towards the east a long way (paldrupa), and that when rain comes they lie down on their backs with their legs open, and the water runs into their person and causes them to bear a lot of young blacks called Muree; who, as they grow up, start westward, always throwing a small waddy, called weetchu, before them, till one of them meets a blackfellow with his lubra. The Muree, being invisible, then walks in the blackfellow' s tracks to make him or her look like the blackfellow, and then throws the small waddy under the thumb-nail or great toe-nail, and so enters into the woman's body. She is soon pregnant, and in due time gives birth to an ordinary child.'

Alternative names

 Anjamutina, Andyamatana
 Anjimatana (Kuyani exonym = 'hill people.')
 Anyamatana, Adnjamatana, Adnjamadana, Adjnjamatana, Adyamatana
 Archualda
 Atjualda. (mishearing of preceding)
 Benbakanjamata. (Kuyani exonym meaning "Pine Hills people")
 Binbarnja. (Wadikali exonym from binba = Callitris)
 Gadjnjamadja
 Kanjamata, Kanjimata. (Wongkanguru exonym))
 Keidnamutha
 Keydnjamarda
 Kudnamietha. (eastern tribal exonym, kudna = feces, i.e. shit-eaters).
 Kutchnamootha
 Mardala. (Diyari exonym from Wailpi ma:dəla, meaning 'no'.)
 Mardula
 Ngatjuwalda. ("our speech," language name),
 Nimalda
 Nimbalda, Nimbaldi. (misprint).
 Nuralda
 Umbertana. (error for Umberatana, a toponym)
 Unyamatana, Unyamootha
 Wadla. ("Scrub wallabies," Diyari pejorative exonym)
 Wailbi. (in Barngarla, this word means 'south west')
 Wajalpi
 Wipie

Notes

Citations

Sources

Aboriginal peoples of South Australia